Rincão is a municipality in the state of São Paulo in Brazil. The population is 10,812 (2020 est.) in an area of 317 km2. The elevation is 530 m.

References

Municipalities in São Paulo (state)